Gerald Henry King (born 7 April 1947) is a Welsh former professional footballer who played as a winger. He made 98 appearances in the Football League during spells with Cardiff City, Torquay United, Luton Town and Newport County.

Career
Having represented Wales at schoolboy level, King made his professional debut for Cardiff City during the 1964–65 season. After making six league appearances, he lost his place in the side to Bernie Lewis and was allowed to leave for Torquay United. He later played for Luton Town and Newport County.

References

1947 births
Living people
Welsh footballers
Cardiff City F.C. players
Torquay United F.C. players
Luton Town F.C. players
Newport County A.F.C. players
English Football League players
Association football wingers